The 2004 Big South Conference baseball tournament  was the postseason baseball tournament for the Big South Conference, held from May 26 through 29 at Winthrop Ballpark, home field of Winthrop in Rock Hill, South Carolina.  The top six finishers participated in the double-elimination tournament. The champion, won the title for the seventh time, and fourth in a row, and earned an invitation to the 2004 NCAA Division I baseball tournament.

Format
The top six finishers from the regular season qualified for the tournament.  The teams were seeded one through six based on conference winning percentage and played a double-elimination tournament.

Bracket and results

All-Tournament Team

Most Valuable Player
Steven Carter was named Tournament Most Valuable Player.  Carter was a pitcher for Coastal Carolina, and won the award for the second of two consecutive years.  Through 2020, Carter is the only player to earn the award twice.

References

Tournament
Big South Conference Baseball Tournament
Big South baseball tournament
Big South Conference baseball tournament